Charles W. Hoitt (October 21, 1847 – April 2, 1925) was an American lawyer and politician from Nashua, New Hampshire who served in both houses of the New Hampshire legislature, as President of the New Hampshire Senate and as the United States Attorney for the District of New Hampshire.
 
Hoitt was born in Newmarket, New Hampshire on October 21, 1847

In 1871 Hoitt graduated from Dartmouth College.

Hoitt married Harriet Louisa Gilman daughter of Virgil C. Gilman.

Hoitt was admitted to the New Hampshire Bar, and practiced law in Nashua, New Hampshire.

Hoitt served in the New Hampshire House of Representatives in 1901.

Hoitt served as a judge in the Municipal Court from 1889 to 1907.

On February 11, 1907 Hoitt was appointed by Theodore Roosevelt to be the United States Attorney for the District of New Hampshire.

Notes

External links 

1847 births
1925 deaths
People from Newmarket, New Hampshire
Dartmouth College alumni
Republican Party New Hampshire state senators
Presidents of the New Hampshire Senate
United States Department of Justice lawyers
United States Attorneys for the District of New Hampshire